This was the first edition of the tournament, which was primarily organized to compensate for the cancellation of Asian tournaments in 2021 due to the COVID-19 pandemic.

Casper Ruud won the title, defeating Cameron Norrie in the final, 6–0, 6–2.

Seeds
The top four seeds received a bye into the second round.

Draw

Finals

Top half

Bottom half

Qualifying

Seeds

Qualifiers

Lucky losers

Qualifying draw

First qualifier

Second qualifier

Third qualifier

Fourth qualifier

References

External links
Main draw
Qualifying draw

2021 ATP Tour